Hendrik Schoock (baptised 4 May 1630, Utrecht – 24 July 1707, Utrecht), was a Dutch Golden Age painter.

Biography
According to Arnold Houbraken he was a pupil of Jan Lievens and Abraham Bloemaert who later took to garland painting in the manner of Jan Davidsz. de Heem. He had already become a history painter, but encouraged by De Heem, he changed to still life painting.

According to the RKD he helped Gerard Hoet set up a drawing academy in Utrecht in 1697.

Gallery

References

Hendrik Schoock on Artnet

1630 births
1707 deaths
Artists from Utrecht
Dutch Golden Age painters
Dutch male painters
Dutch still life painters
Flower artists